Giovanni is a male Italian given name (from Latin Ioannes). It is the Italian equivalent of John. Giovanni is frequently contracted to Gianni, Gian, or Gio, particularly in the name Gianbattista, and can also be found as a surname. It is sometimes spelled as Geovanni, Giovonnie, Giovannie, Jiovanni or when used as an English female name. Its female counterpart is Giovanna.

Given name
Pope St. Paul VI (1897-1978), whose given name was Giovanni Battista Montini
Pope Gelasius II (c. 1060–1119), whose given name was Giovanni Coniulo
Pope Leo X (1475–1521), whose given name was Giovanni di Lorenzo de' Medici
Giovanni Agnelli (1866–1945), Italian entrepreneur and founder of Fiat
Giovanni Amelino-Camelia (born 1965), Italian physicist
Giovanni Arnolfini (c. 1400–c. 1450), merchant from Lucca
Giovanni Báez (born 1981), Colombian road cyclist
Giovanni Battaglin (born 1951), Italian road cyclist
Giovanni Becatti (1912–1973), Italian archaeologist
Giovanni Bellini (c. 1430–1516), Italian Renaissance painter
Giovanni Battista Belzoni (1778–1823), Venetian explorer in Egypt
Giovanni Benelli (1921-1982), Cardinal Archbishop of Florence, Italy
Giovanni Boccaccio (1313–1375), Italian Renaissance writer
Giovanni Boldini (1842–1931), Italian painter
Giovanni Bononcini (1670–1747), Italian Baroque composer and cellist
Giovanni Borgia (1475–1497), son of Pope Alexander VI
Giovanni Bosco (1815–1888), Italian saint
Giovanni Botero (c. 1544–1617), Italian writer, thinker, priest, poet, and diplomat
Giovani Casillas (born 1994), Mexican footballer
Giovanni Cirfiera, Italian actor
Giovanni Antonio Colonna (1878–1940), Italian noble and politician
Giovanni Dandolo (died 1289), 48th Doge of Venice
Giovanni D'Aleo (born 1959), Italian long-distance runner
Giovanni da Verrazzano (c. 1480–c. 1520), Italian explorer
Giovanni de Macque (c. 1540–1614), late Renaissance Franco-Flemish composer
 Giovanni di Bernardone (c.1181–1226), better known as Saint Francis of Assisi
Giovanni di Giovanni (c. 1350–1365), Italian youth executed for sodomy
Giovani dos Santos (born 1989), Mexican football player
Giovanni Evangelisti (born 1961), Italian long jumper
Giovanni Falcone (1939–1992), Italian judge
Giovanni Ferrari (1907–1982), Italian football player
Giovanni Fornasini (1915–1944), Italian priest, recipient of Italy's Gold Medal of Military Valour, Servant of God
Giovanni Frezza (born 1972), Italian actor
Giovanni Girolamo Frezza (1506–1561), Italian engraver
Giovanni Gabrieli (1557–1612), Italian early baroque composer
Giovanni Galbaio (8th century–804), eighth Doge of Venice
Giovanni Giacometti (1868–1933), Swiss painter
Giovanni B. Giglioni (1929–2008), American business theorist
Giovanni Gozzadini (1810–1887), Italian archaeologist
Giovanni Bernardo Gremoli, Catholic bishop
Giovanni Infantino, known as Gianni Infantino (born 1970), Swiss football administrator with Italian citizenship
Giovanni Jona-Lasinio (born 1932), Italian theoretical physicist
Giovanni Lapentti (born 1983), Ecuadorian tennis player
Giovanni Lavaggi (born 1958), Italian racing driver 
Giovani Lo Celso (born 1996), Argentine footballer
Giovanni Marradi (1852–1922), Italian poet
Giovanni Marradi (musician) (born 1952), pianist, composer and arranger
Giovanni Giorgio Moroder (born 1940), Italian record producer, songwriter, performer, and DJ
Giovanni Paisiello (1740–1816), Italian composer
Giovanni Palandrani (born 1996), American drag queen better known by the stage name Aquaria
Giovanni Papini (1881–1956), Italian journalist, essayist, literary critic, poet, and novelist
Giovanni I Participazio (died 837), tenth (historical) or twelfth (traditional) Doge of Venice
Giovanni Passannante (1849–1910), Italian anarchist
Giovanni Pernice (born 1990), Italian dancer
Giovanni Pico della Mirandola (1463–1494), Italian philosopher
Giovanni Pieraccini (1918–2017), Italian journalist and socialist 
Giovanni Pisano (1250–1315), Italian sculptor, painter and architect
Giovanni Pittella (born 1958), Italian politician 
Giovanni Prandini (1940–2018), Italian politician
Giovanni Reyna (born 2002), American soccer player
Giovanni Ribisi (born 1974), American actor
Giovanni Ricci (American football) (born 1996), American football player
Giovonnie Samuels (born 1985), Actress
Giovanni Sbrissa (born 1996) Italian footballer
Giovanni Scalise (1900-1929), later John Scalise, Italian-American organized crime figure
Giovanni Schiaparelli (1835–1910), Italian astronomer
Giovanni Antonio Scopoli (1723–1788), Italian physician and naturalist
Giovanni Semerano (1913–2005), Italian philologist
Giovanni Sgambati (1841-1914), Italian composer and pianist
Giovanni Silva de Oliveira (born 1972), usually known as Giovanni, Brazilian soccer player
Giovanni Simeone (born 1995), Argentine football player
Giovanni Spadolini (1925–1994), liberal Italian politician, the 45th Prime Minister of Italy
Giovanni Stampa (1913–?), Italian sailor
Giovanni Targioni Tozzetti (1712–1783), Italian naturalist
Giovanni Targioni-Tozzetti (1863–1934), Italian librettist
Giovanni Trapattoni (born 1939), Italian football coach and player
Giovanni van Bronckhorst (born 1975), Dutch football player
Giovanni Vemba-Duarte (born 1991), Dutch–Angolan footballer
Giovanni Vinci (born 1990), Italian professional wrestler
Giovanni Visconti (archbishop) (1290–1354), Italian Roman Catholic cardinal

Surname
 Aria Giovanni (born 1977), model and adult film actress, Penthouse Pet for the month of September 2000
 Joy Giovanni (born 1978), actress and former WWE Diva
 Nikki Giovanni (born 1943), American poet, activist and author
 Severino Di Giovanni (19011931), Italian anarchist

Nickname
 Don Manley (born 1945), a compiler of crosswords known as Giovanni

Fictional characters
 Don Giovanni, protagonist of the eponymous Mozart opera
 Giovanni Francis "Johnny Boy" Soprano, father of Tony Soprano from The Sopranos
 Giovanni (Pokémon), boss of Team Rocket in the fictional world of Pokémon
 Giovanni Auditore, father of player character Ezio in the Assassin's Creed series of video games
 Giovanni Zito, character from the Eoin Colfer novel Artemis Fowl: The Opal Deception
Giovanni Capello, character from 1970's British comedy, Mind Your Language
 Giovanni, a character from Animal Crossing: Pocket Camp
 Giovanni, a blue cat, character from Night on the Galactic Railroad
 Giovanni, a waiter, the eponymous character in James Baldwin's novel Giovanni's Room

See also
 Geovani
 Giovanni Battista
 Giovanelli
 Giovannelli
 Giovannetti
 Giovannini

 Masculine given names
English masculine given names 
Italian masculine given names
Swiss masculine given names
Surnames from given names